The Lion King 1½ is a 2004 American animated direct-to-video musical comedy film produced by the Australian branch of Disneytoon Studios and released direct to video on February 10, 2004. The third and final installment released in the original Lion King trilogy, it is based on The Lion King's Timon & Pumbaa and serves as an origin story for the meerkat/warthog duo Timon and Pumbaa while the film is also set within the events of The Lion King. A majority of the original voice cast from the first film returns to reprise their roles, including Nathan Lane and Ernie Sabella as the voices of Timon and Pumbaa, respectively. The plot of the movie seems to be inspired by Tom Stoppard's Rosencrantz and Guildenstern Are Dead, a tragicomedy that tells the story of Hamlet from the point of view of 2 minor characters.

Plot
In a dark theater (a parody of Mystery Science Theater 3000) Timon and Pumbaa watch the original film until Timon decides to fast-forward to the scene where they first appear, but Pumbaa then tries to rewind it to the beginning. This eventually leads to them fighting over the remote control, until Timon eventually gets the idea of telling the story of how both of them met and how they learned about Hakuna Matata. Pumbaa agrees with his idea, and Timon rewinds the film to before the beginning, where the story begins.

Timon is a social outcast in his meerkat colony on the outskirts of the Pride Lands, as he frequently messes things up by accident. Though he is unconditionally supported by his mother, Timon dreams of a better life than his colony's bleak existence, continually hiding from predators. One day, he is assigned as a sentry in an attempt by his mother to get him accepted, but his daydreaming leads to the near death of his uncle, Max, at the hands of the hyenas Shenzi, Banzai and Ed. Now ostracized and convinced that he will never fit in with the other meerkats, Timon decides to leave to find a better life. After bidding his mother farewell, he meets the mandrill Rafiki, who teaches him about "Hakuna Matata", and advises him to "look beyond what you see". Timon takes this advice literally and observes Pride Rock in the distance. Believing Pride Rock to be his dream home, Timon ventures in that direction and encounters Pumbaa the warthog on his way. The two quickly form a bond, and Pumbaa accompanies Timon on his journey.

The pair arrive at Pride Rock during the presentation of Simba to the animals of the Pride Lands. As they make their way through the crowd of onlookers, Pumbaa explosively passes gas due to his fear of crowds, causing the nearby animals to faint, but prompting animals further away to bow to Simba. Following this, Timon and Pumbaa make multiple attempts to set up homes throughout the Pride Lands, but wind up being forced away every time upon witnessing several events from the original film, such as Simba singing "I Just Can't Wait to Be King", Mufasa's fight with the hyenas, and Scar's conspiring with the hyenas. Eventually, the pair are caught in the wildebeest stampede that killed Mufasa, and are thrown off a waterfall in their attempt to escape. Exhausted, Timon decides to give up and realizes that Pumbaa is the only friend that he has ever had. The next morning, Pumbaa discovers a luxurious green jungle that he had tried to tell Timon about earlier. With their dream home found, they settle there, embracing "Hakuna Matata" as their life's philosophy.

Some time later, Timon and Pumbaa encounter Simba in a nearby desert, nearly dead. They rescue him and decide to raise him under their philosophy. Years later, Nala appears and reunites with Simba after chasing and mistaking Pumbaa for food. Believing Hakuna Matata to be in jeopardy, Timon and Pumbaa attempt to sabotage their dates, but fail every time. Upon witnessing Simba and Nala's argument, Simba disappears much to Timon thinking that they won. The next day Nala explains that he had run off to challenge Scar and reclaim Pride Rock, meaning he would need their help. Upset that Simba left them, Timon decides to stay behind, but Pumbaa, annoyed that Timon would callously abandon Simba when he needs him, follows Simba and Nala. Timon indulges in the jungle's luxuries by himself, but loneliness starts to overwhelm him. After feeling sad and lonely, Timon is met with Rafiki, who indirectly makes him realize that his true Hakuna Matata is with the ones he loves (not just the place he sought for), prompting Timon to take off after the others.

Timon catches up and reconciles with Pumbaa before journeying onward to Pride Rock to join Simba and Nala. After helping Simba and Nala distract the hyenas with a hula dance, Timon and Pumbaa run into Ma and Uncle Max, who had come looking for Timon after Ma had gotten angry at Rafiki for apparently leading Timon on a wild goose chase. Timon proposes that they all help Simba by getting rid of Scar and the hyenas. While Simba battles Scar on the top of Pride Rock, Ma and Uncle Max are directed to construct a series of tunnels beneath the hyenas, while at the same time, Timon and Pumbaa use various tactics to distract them (e.g. Timon attempting to propose to Shenzi, much to her disgust) while the tunnel is being made. When the tunnels are finished, Max knocks down the support beams, breaking the ground under the hyenas. However, the last few beams get jammed, prompting Timon to dive underground and break them himself. The cave-in commences, and the hyenas are ejected through the tunnels, just in time to confront Scar and kill him. Simba accepts his place as the rightful king of the Pride Lands, thanking Timon and Pumbaa for their help. Timon takes Pumbaa, Ma, Uncle Max, and the rest of the meerkat colony to live in the predator-free jungle to complete his Hakuna Matata, and he is praised as their hero.

When the story finished, Ma, Uncle Max, Simba, Rafiki, and eventually many other Disney characters (such as Mickey Mouse, Donald Duck, Goofy, Snow White and the Seven Dwarfs, Aladdin and Jasmine with the Genie, Stitch, Pocahontas, Dumbo, etc.) join Timon and Pumbaa to rewatch the film in the theater, during which Pumbaa tells Timon that he 'still doesn't do so well in crowds'.

Voice cast

A few of the original cast, including Nathan Lane, Ernie Sabella, and Matthew Broderick, resume their roles from The Lion King, while other actors resume their roles from The Lion King II: Simba's Pride. James Earl Jones and Jeremy Irons did not return to play their characters, so Mufasa and Scar don't have any lines of dialogue when they appear in the film and Matt Weinberg replaced Jonathan Taylor Thomas as the voice of Simba as a cub.

 Nathan Lane as Timon, a meerkat who is Pumbaa's best friend. Though somewhat selfish, arrogant, and withdrawn, Timon shows courageous loyalty towards his friends.
 Ernie Sabella as Pumbaa, a warthog who is Timon's best friend. Though slow-witted, he is very empathetic and willing to trust and befriend anyone. He is also claustrophobic and passes gas in crowds.
 Julie Kavner as Ma, Timon's caring mother. She is overly protective and attached to her son, often trying to get him accepted amongst the colony, but never succeeding. 
 Jerry Stiller as Max, Timon's paranoid, eccentric but kind-hearted uncle. He initially doubts Timon's ability, but warms up to him at the film's climax. 
 Matthew Broderick as Simba, Timon and Pumbaa's second best friend, Mufasa and Sarabi's son, Scar's nephew, Nala's husband and the current King of the Pride Lands.
Matt Weinberg voices Simba as a cub.
 Moira Kelly as Nala, Simba's childhood friend and eventual wife.
 Robert Guillaume as Rafiki, a monkey who teaches Timon Hakuna Matata, as well as giving him faith in himself to do what he dreams of doing. 
 Whoopi Goldberg, Cheech Marin and Jim Cummings as Shenzi, Banzai and Ed, a trio of spotted hyenas who act as the local predators of Timon's meerkat colony before their allegiance with Scar.
 Edward Hibbert as Zazu, a red-billed hornbill and the majordomo to Mufasa and later Simba.

Production
In April 2000, it was announced that the Walt Disney Company had selected Jeff Ahlholm, Colin Goldman, and Tom Rogers to write the script for The Lion King 3. It was scheduled to arrive in video stores sometime in 2001. Bradley Raymond, who had previously directed Pocahontas II: Journey to a New World (1998) and The Hunchback of Notre Dame II (2002), came on board as director. He recalled that it was then-Disney Feature Animation president Thomas Schumacher's idea to "retell Lion King through the eyes of Timon and Pumbaa". Additionally, Roger Allers and Irene Mecchi, who directed and co-wrote the screenplay for The Lion King respectively, consulted on the production. According to Raymond, it was Allers who came up with the Mystery Science Theater 3000–inspired framing of the film. Furthermore, the filmmakers drew inspiration from Tom Stoppard's play Rosencrantz and Guildenstern are Dead as the first Lion King film had drawn inspiration from Hamlet.

In May 2003, The Lion King  was scheduled for home video release in early spring 2004 with Nathan Lane, Ernie Sabella, and Matthew Broderick reprising their original roles, and Elton John and Tim Rice returning to compose a new song, "That’s All I Need".

The film was animated by Walt Disney Animation Australia in Sydney, New South Wales and Disneytoon Studios in the United States.

Release
Upon its initial home video release, The Lion King  was accompanied by a marketing campaign tie-in with McDonald's with six Happy Meal toys: Simba, Rafiki, Timon, Pumbaa, Mufasa and Ed. (This same promotion was used in international countries for the Special Edition release of the first Lion King with two additional toys featuring Zazu and Scar.)

The DVD edition contained include music videos, deleted scenes, behind-the-scenes views of how the movie was made, and two featurettes: Timon -- The Early Years; a mockumentary tracing Timon's childhood through tongue-in-cheek interviews with family and friends; and Disney's Funniest Moments, highlighting Disney animated characters from the Seven Dwarfs to Brother Bear. Three games are also featured, including: Timon and Pumbaa's Virtual Safari 1.5, a Lion King trivia game in the format of Who Wants to Be a Millionaire, titled Who Wants to Be King of the Jungle?, and hosted by Meredith Vieira, then-host of the U.S. syndicated version and a find the face game. The Lion King  was released on February 10, 2004. Internationally, it was titled The Lion King 3: Hakuna Matata.

On its first day of sales, the film sold 1.5 million DVD copies, and in its first three days of release the film generated about $55 million in sales revenue, 2.5 of which were DVD copies of the film. By March 2004, six million DVD and VHS copies of the film had been sold in North America. More than 30 percent of the title's sales were from the Latino market. Later that year, the movie was released as part of a 3-movie box set along with The Lion King and The Lion King II: Simba's Pride on December 6. On January 31, 2005, the film, along with its predecessors, went back into moratorium.

The film was first released on Blu-ray as part of an eight-disc box set on October 4, 2011, along with the other two films. The movie later received a separate Blu-ray release as well as a standard DVD release on March 6, 2012, along with The Lion King II: Simba's Pride. The Blu-ray and DVD releases, along with Simba's Pride and the Diamond Edition release of The Lion King, were removed from release on April 30, 2013.

The film was re-released by Walt Disney Studios Home Entertainment on a Blu-ray combo pack and digital release along with The Lion King II: Simba's Pride on August 29, 2017 — the same day as the first film's Signature Edition was released.

Reception
On Rotten Tomatoes, the film has an approval rating of  based on  reviews, with an average rating of 6.4/10.

Frank Lovece of TV Guide gave the film  stars out of 4 stating that "This retelling of The Lion King (1994) from the point of view of comic sidekicks Timon (voice of Nathan Lane) and Pumbaa (Ernie Sabella) is one of the rare Disney direct-to-video sequels worthy of the original." He went on to say that 'the only aspect of the film that feels forced is the revisionist positioning of Timon as young Simba's step-dad, which has no emotional echo in the first film. The quality of the animation is surprisingly impressive; some static backgrounds are the primary concession to a small-screen budget and the fluid character movements and expressions are vastly superior to those of, say, The Lion King's Timon and Pumbaa TV cartoon series.'" Joe Leydon of Variety gave the film a positive review, writing "toddlers and preschoolers will be equally enchanted and amused by colorful toon shenanigans." Los Angeles Times article writer Susan King wrote that "Because Disney's made-for-video sequels to their classic animated films have been mediocre at best, expectations for this new sequel to the mouse house's 1994 blockbuster were slim. But thanks to a clever story line, snappy dialogue that kids and adults will enjoy, a couple of decent new songs and the return of the original voice actors, Lion King  is an irreverent gas."

Many reviewers have suggested that the film was influenced by the Tom Stoppard play Rosencrantz and Guildenstern Are Dead, which follows Rosencrantz and Guildenstern, two minor characters from Shakespeare's play Hamlet, and details their experiences taking place during the same time as the events of Hamlet, similar to what the film does with its predecessor, which has been similarly compared to Hamlet.  Screenwriter Tom Rogers confirmed that this was intentional in a 2019 interview, adding that the film's frame story was inspired by Mystery Science Theater 3000.

Soundtrack 

The film's soundtrack album contains two original songs: "Diggah Tunnah", written by Seth Friedman and Martin Erskine, and "That's All I Need", written by Elton John and Tim Rice, who had worked on the first film. The latter song, which is performed by Nathan Lane in the film, is largely based on a deleted song from The Lion King titled "The Warthog Rhapsody", with which it shares a similar melody.

The film features the song "Hakuna Matata" from the first film, which is featured both as the original soundtrack recording in the soundtrack album and in the film as a new cover performed by Lane and Ernie Sabella. The soundtrack also consists of various covers of pop songs, such as The Friends of Distinction's "Grazing in the Grass" performed by Raven-Symoné, Kool and the Gang's "Jungle Boogie" performed by Drew K. and the French, and "The Lion Sleeps Tonight" (which appears briefly in the original film as well) by Lebo M. Vinx (and with sampled vocals from Lebo M.) performed "Diggah Tunnah Dance". Other featured songs not on the soundtrack include "Sunrise, Sunset" from the musical Fiddler on the Roof and the eponymous theme song from the television show Peter Gunn composed by Henry Mancini.

The film contains an original score composed by Don L. Harper, and also features Ennio Morricone's instrumental theme from the Sergio Leone film The Good, the Bad and the Ugly.

Track listing

Awards and nominations

Video game

A video game based on the film was published in 2003 for the Game Boy Advance, featuring Timon and Pumbaa as the playable characters.

References

External links 

 
 
 
 
 

2004 films
2004 animated films
2004 direct-to-video films
2000s adventure films
2000s American animated films
2000s buddy comedy films
2000s musical comedy films
American adventure comedy films
American children's animated adventure films
American children's animated comedy films
American children's animated musical films
American films with live action and animation
American musical comedy films
American sequel films
Annie Award winners
Animated buddy films
Animated films about lions
Films about meerkats
Films directed by Bradley Raymond
Animated films about friendship
DisneyToon Studios animated films
Disney direct-to-video animated films
Direct-to-video interquel films
Direct-to-video prequel films
Films set in Africa
The Lion King (franchise)
2004 comedy films
Self-reflexive films
2000s English-language films
American prequel films